Oberwiesenthal (officially Kurort Oberwiesenthal) is a town and a ski resort in the district of Erzgebirgskreis in Saxony in Germany. It is situated in the Ore Mountains, on the border with the Czech Republic, 19 km south of Annaberg-Buchholz, and 23 km northeast of Karlovy Vary. At , it is the highest town in Germany. The Olympic and World Championships goldmedalist in ski jumping Jens Weißflog competed for SC Tractor Oberwiesenthal and Oberwiesenthaler SV.

Geography 
Oberwiesenthal lies in the county of Erzgebirgskreis, on the border with the Czech Republic that follows the course of the Pöhlbach stream as far as Bärenstein (10 km northeast).

Other important mountains in the region around Oberwiesenthal are the:
 Keilberg (Klínovec) (the highest summit in the Ore Mountains)
 Kleiner or Hinterer Fichtelberg ("Little or Farther Fichtelberg")
 Eisenberg

Neighbouring municipalities 
On the Czech side is the municipality of Loučná pod Klínovcem (Böhmisch Wiesenthal) and, further west, is Boží Dar (Gottesgab). Adjacent municipalities in Germany are Bärenstein, Crottendorf, Sehmatal, Breitenbrunn/Erzgeb. and Raschau-Markersbach.

Subdivisions 
 Oberwiesenthal
 Unterwiesenthal
 Hammerunterwiesenthal
 Rotes Vorwerk
 Neues Haus

History 
The "new town in the Wiesen valley" ("Neustadt am Wiesenthal") was founded in 1527 by the lords of Schönburg as a mining town because, one year earlier, silver ore had been found in the region. By 1530 the new settlement had been granted town rights and, in 1559, its ownership passed to the House of Wettin.

Mining operations finally wound up in the 19th century and tourism increasingly took its place during the 20th. However, after the Second World War, there were attempts by the Russians to mine uranium for the nuclear arms race in the Zechengrund, today a nature reserve. Traces of their activity are still visible. On 1 September 1921 Oberwiesenthal was merged with the town of Unterwiesenthal further down the valley, which had first been mentioned in the records in 1406 and had town rights by 1510. From 1952 to 1990, Oberwiesenthal was part of the Bezirk Karl-Marx-Stadt of East Germany.

Historical population 

 Data source to 1990: Data source from 1998: Statistisches Landesamt Sachsen

Politics

Town council 
The town council of Oberwiesenthal consists of 14 councillors and the directly elected mayor or Bürgermeister, who presides over the council. The local elections of 7 June 2009, which had a voter participation of 62.5%, the following result:

Mayor 
Heinz-Michael Kirsten (CDU) was elected mayor (Bürgermeister) in January 2002. By February 2002 the Annaberg district office (Landratsamt Annaberg) had declared this result void due to unpermitted election advertising. This resulted in a five-year legal battle by all sides that ended with a decision in 2007 by the Federal Administrative Court in Leipzig, that confirmed the decision in February 2007 by the administrative appeals tribunal (Oberverwaltungsgericht) of Bautzen as legal. Heinz-Michael Kirsten was then sent on leave by the regional authority (Regierungspräsidium). On 4 November 2007 a new election took place in which no party achieved an absolute majority. In the second round of elections on 18 November the independent (now FDP) candidate, Mirko Ernst, was elected mayor. The current mayor is Jens Benedict, elected in September 2021.

Twinnings 
  Fichtelberg, town "friendship" (Städtefreundschaft) since 3 October 1990
  Lauf an der Pegnitz, town friendship since 3 October 1990
  Schonach im Schwarzwald, town friendship since 3 October 1990
  Hakuba, twin town since 18 August 2002

Culture and sights 
 Fichtelberg Railway
 Fichtelberg Cable Car (the oldest cable car in Germany)
 Oberwiesenthal post coach in the style of the Deutsche Reichspost of 1939

Museum 
 Ski and local history museum, Karlsbader Straße 3

Structures 
 St Martin Luther's Church with its Hertelt crib
 Distance post on the market square (Marktplatz); whole milepost on the footpath to the "New House" (Neues Haus) in the Zechengrund and remnants of a half-milepost from the village of Hammerunterwiesenthal
 Royal Saxon station stone from the market square at the Neues Haus border crossing
 Anton Günther Way, a cross-border trail

Sport 
 Currently the leading sports club in the town: WSC Erzgebirge Oberwiesenthal
 Leading former East German Alpine and Nordic ski club, disbanded in 1990: SC Traktor Oberwiesenthal
 Sportfördergruppe der Bundeswehr, armed forces sports centre

Notable people 
 Franz Ströher (1874-1936), German hairdresser and businessman

References 

 
Czech Republic–Germany border crossings
Erzgebirgskreis
Populated places established in 1527